Western Savanna Province is one of the 15 provinces in the Cundinamarca Department, Colombia.

Subdivision 
The Western Savanna province is subdivided into 8 municipalities:

References 

Provinces of Cundinamarca Department